The Duchy of Mecklenburg was a duchy within the Holy Roman Empire, located in the region of Mecklenburg. It existed during the Late Middle Ages and the early modern period, from 1471 to 1520, as well as 1695 to 1701. Its capital was Schwerin.

The state was formed in 1471, when duke Henry IV, had united the duchies of Mecklenburg-Stargard and Mecklenburg-Schwerin. The state existed until 7 May 1520, when it was partitioned into the duchies of Mecklenburg-Güstrow and Mecklenburg-Schwerin. It was again reestablished in 1695, with the unification of Mecklenburg-Güstrow and Mecklenburg-Schwerin. Frederick William became the duke. In 1701, it was partitioned into the duchies of Mecklenburg-Schwerin and Mecklenburg-Strelitz.

List of rulers

First state 
 Henry IV and John VI (1471–1472)
 Henry IV (1472–1477)
 Magnus II, Albert VI and Balthasar (1477–1483)
 Magnus II and Balthasar (1483–1503)
 Balthasar, Eric II, Albrecht VII and Henry V, Duke of Mecklenburg (1503–1507)
 Eric II, Albrecht VII and Henry V, Duke of Mecklenburg (1508)
 Albrecht VII and Henry V, Duke of Mecklenburg (1508–1520)

Second state 
 Frederick William (1695–1701)

Citations

Notes

References

Bibliography 
 

 Former countries in Europe
 Former monarchies of Europe
Duchies of the Holy Roman Empire
History of Mecklenburg
 15th-century establishments in Europe
 16th-century disestablishments in Europe
 17th-century establishments in Europe
 18th-century disestablishments in Europe
 15th century in the Holy Roman Empire
 16th century in the Holy Roman Empire
 17th century in the Holy Roman Empire
 18th century in the Holy Roman Empire
 States and territories established in 1471
 States and territories disestablished in 1520
 States and territories established in 1695
 States and territories disestablished in 1701